Kawasoti is a municipality in Nawalpur District, Gandaki Province, Nepal. The Naryani River flows south of it, and the Mahabharat Range is north of it.

Kawasoti serves as administrative headquarter for Nawalpur district, locating all major government and administrative offices. With the rapid increase in population and development of infrastructures, this city is quickly emerging into a business, educational and health hub on the center of the East-West Highway.
It is one of the beautiful cities of Nawalpur district and is located in the middle of the country. It is also known as a greenery city where 60% of land is occupied by the forests where people can get the fresh air and the bacteria-free water which is important stuff for the human beings.

Nowadays Kawasoti VDC is better known by its new identity, i.e. Kawasoti municipality. People from various castes and religions coexist in this city with a majority of them  Buddhists  some Hindus and other religions Christians, Muslims. More than 35 private and government schools and 3 colleges (Lumbini, Madhyabindu, and Kumarwarti) provide education from kindergarten to the master's degree level, which is attended by students as far as 30-km far from the city. City also serves many local hospitals and pharmacies for the health facilities of residents. It has got well-paved road networks, strong telecommunication service, well-managed drinking water, and drainage system and major sources for shopping and entertainment. In Kawasoti, police, as well as traffic police have been doing their extraordinary job all over the district Nawalpur.

People have been constantly migrating to this city from neighboring hilly regions and districts for the last 30–40 years which was otherwise largely occupied by dense forests that lead to Chitwan National Park directly towards the south of this city.There are 17 wards in Kawasoti municipality

History

Kawasoti Administration 
Kawasoti municipality is a Local government body formed in 2071 BS. It has 17 wards numbered from 1 to 17. Earlier, there were four VDCs namely Kawasoti, Shivmandir, Agyauli, Pithauli. The first mayor of the city was Chandra Kumari Pun elected in 2074 BS. Bishnu Prasad Bhusal has been elected as the new mayor of the Kawasoti defeating the next candidate Mahendra Prasad Pokhrel.

Population 

According to the Website of the Kawasoti Municipality, The population of the Kawasoti Municipality is 62,421.
Male: 28,616
Female: 33,805
Total: 62,421
Total Household: 14,104
Total Land: 114 square Kilometer
Total Wards: 17

Main Casts 

Magar, Gurung, Tamang, Kumal, Newar, Bhujel, Bote, Kami, Damai, Brahman, Kshetri, Tharu,Thakuri

Religion 

Major: Hindu
Minor: Buddhist, Muslim, Christian

Occupation

Water Supply and Sanitation

Water Supply 

There exists Kawasoti water supply system constructed under a small town that serves the town. There are two sources one is spring and another is a stream which is providing water to the small town. There is well type intake in Kerunga Khola.

Sanitation 

Solid waste management and toilet are the burning issues of this town. A Report prepared on Kawasoti/Shiv mandir Water Supply and Sanitation Project states 69.19% of the population has access to some kind of toilet. Among which about 25% of HH have pit latrines, 13.19% have pit toilets with slab and 30.81% have water sealed latrines. Also, 0.1% has modern toilets constructed in their households. However, some places show deteriorated conditions, mainly due to open defecation and mismanagement of waste disposal. Solid waste has been managed to a certain extent. SSODECC-Nepal, a local NGO, is working on solid waste management. Generally, there is the door to the collection and disposal of off to a dumping site.

Education 
Kawasoti has become a well-educated place and has got different educational offers. There are many governments as well as private schools, colleges, and institutes giving their great contributions to the educational sector of the whole district Nawalpur.
In 2072, HSEB Science Examination District First and Second have got their local campus Madhyabindu Multiple Campus.
Lumbini Aawasiya Madhyamik Vidhyalaya is the only school in the town that is undertaking the training of National Cadet Corps under the supervision of the Nepal Army. More importantly, Lumbini Aawasiya Madhyamik Vidhyalaya is also having students exchange at the international level. Shree Shiva Higher Secondary School is a top school of Kawasoti as well as it lies in the top 10 schools in Nepal and is named as a model school of Nepal.

Private, Government and Community Schools in Kawasosti Municipality 
 Lumbini Aawasiya Madhyamik Vidhyalaya, Kawasoti-2
 Shree Shiva Higher Secondary School, Shivamandir
 Shree Tribhuwan Bal Secondary School, Kawasoti-17
 Shree Sunshine Secondary Bording School, Kawasoti-17
 Shree Jeevan Jyoti Secondary school, Kawastoi bazaar
 Shree Gyanodaya Secondary School, Kawasoti 8
 Noble Academy, Shaikshik Chowk (kawasoti 8)
 Gandaki Secondary Boarding School, Kawasoti Municipality-08, Nawalpur
 Samata School, Kawasoti
 Siddhartha Boarding Secondary School, Kawasoti
 Nawalpur Academy, Danda, Shahidnagar
 Shree Shanti Nikunja Higher Secondary School, Pithauli
 Shree Janta Secondary School, Tribuwantar
 Shree Kalika Secondary School, Laxminagar

Higher Level Educational Centers 
 Lumbini Adarsha Degree College, Kawasoti
 Madhyabindu Multiple Campus, Kawasoti (A QAA Certified Institution)
 Kumarwarti Multiple Campus, Kawasoti

Health

Hospitals and Clinics 
 Nawalpur Hospital Pvt. Ltd.
 Madhya Bindu Community Hospital
 Kaligandaki Community Hospital
 Integrated Hospital Pvt. Ltd.
 Ghale Eyes Hospital Pvt. Ltd.
 Nawa Jeewan Hospital Pvt. Ltd.
 Madhya Bindu Eye Care Center
 Kalika Dental Care
 Namuna medical and pathology
 Kumari Hospital, Hasoura
 Sudikshya Ayurved
 Sahish Mahato,kawasoti

Health Centers 
Governmental Health posts: 4 (for every existing VDC, there is one health post) 
including 

1. Shivamandir Health post 
2. Kawosati Health Post
3. Agyauli Health Post
4. Pithauli Health Post
5. Kumarwarti Health Post
6. Madhyabindu District Hospital

Borders 
 East: Devachuli Municipality and Chitwan National Park
 West: Madhyabindu Municipality
 North: Hupsekot Rural Municipality
 South: Chitwan National Park and Narayani River

Major Places 
 Kawasoti Bazaar
 Thana Chowk
 Indra Chowk
 Sabhapati Chowk
 Purano Kawasoti Bazar
 Danda Bazar
 Bishnunagar
 Thakali Chowk
 Magarkot
 Pithauli
 Tharu Village

Media 
To promote local culture, Kawasoti has four FM radio stations and three local TV channels.

Radio Channels 
 Radio Madhyabindu F.M. 101 MHz 
 Radio Nawalpur 104.7 MHz
 Radio Samarthya 92.1 MHz
 Radio Kawasoti 102.0 MHz

Local TV Channels 
 Devchuli TV 
 Mukundasen Television (MTV)
 Buddha Darshan TV

Tourism

Kawasoti is well known for its tourism destination. There are a lot of places to visit around Kawasoti.

1. Amaltari Homestay

2. Devchuli Hills

3. Chitwan National Park

4. Narayani River

References

Municipalities in Gandaki Province
Nepal municipalities established in 2014
Populated places in Nawalpur District